Wrexham Association Football Club is a Welsh professional association football club based in Wrexham, Wales. The team competes in the National League, the fifth tier of the English football league system. Formed in 1864, they are the oldest club in Wales and the third oldest professional association football team in the world.

The club initially participated in friendlies and cup competitions, and first entered a league by joining The Combination in 1890. They spent 13 seasons in the Combination and two seasons in the Welsh Senior League, winning four Combination titles and two Welsh Senior League titles. They entered the Birmingham & District League in 1905, where they would remain until becoming inaugural members of the Football League's Third Division North in 1921. They spent 47 years in the Northern section until they were placed in the re-organised Third Division in 1958 and then relegated two years later. Wrexham were promoted out of the Fourth Division in 1961–62, only to be relegated again two years later. Another promotion followed in 1969–70 and they reached the second tier for the first time after winning the Third Division title in 1977–78. Two successive relegations saw them back in the fourth tier by 1983 and they took until 1992–93 before seeing another promotion. Relegated once more in 2002, they gained immediate promotion in 2002–03, before worsening financial problems resulted in another relegation and then administration in December 2004. It took 18 months for the club to exit administration and the club's decline on the pitch continued, as they dropped out of the Football League in 2008. Wrexham have been out of the Football League ever since, and have had five unsuccessful play-off campaigns in the fifth tier.

Wrexham's honours include winning the Welsh Cup a record 23 times, the Football League Trophy in 2005 at the Millennium Stadium and the FA Trophy in 2013 at Wembley Stadium. The club are also record winners of the short-lived FAW Premier Cup, winning it five times out of the 11 years of its tenure, participating against fellow Welsh clubs such as Cardiff City, Swansea City and Newport County. However, their biggest rivalries are with English clubs, Chester and Shrewsbury Town, with games between the clubs known as the Cross-border derby. In 1992, Wrexham upset the reigning English Champions Arsenal in the FA Cup. They also scored a 1–0 victory over FC Porto in 1984 in the European Cup Winners' Cup. Wrexham were eligible for the European Cup Winners' Cup due to winning the Welsh Cup; their first European tie was against FC Zürich of Switzerland in 1972 and their last was played in Romania against Petrolul Ploiești in 1995. Wrexham's home stadium, the Racecourse Ground, is the world's oldest international stadium that still continues to host international games. The record attendance at the ground was set in 1957, when the club hosted a match against Manchester United in front of 34,445 spectators.

History

1864–1905

The club was formed in October 1864 by members of the Wrexham Cricket Club who wanted a sporting activity for the winter months. This makes them (after Sheffield, Cray, Hallam, and Notts County) the fifth oldest association football team, the third oldest professional club and the oldest in Wales. Their first game was played on 22 October 1864 at the Denbighshire County Cricket Ground (The Racecourse) against the Prince of Wales Fire Brigade.

As the rules of football were still somewhat fluid at the time, early matches featured teams with up to 17 players on each side (16 players when playing the Provincial Insurance Office and Chester College, 15 players against the Volunteer Fire Brigade). In these early years Wrexham were leaders of the campaign to restrict teams to having just 11 players on the pitch at any one time.

In 1876, the newly formed Football Association of Wales saw Wales play their first international match, against Scotland at The West of Scotland Cricket Club, Partick, featuring Edwin Cross and Alfred Davies as the first of many Wrexham F.C. players to play for Wales.

In the 1877–78 season the FAW inaugurated the Welsh Cup competition, to run on similar lines to the English FA Cup. The first Welsh Cup Final was played at Acton Park. Wrexham got to the final of the inaugural competition, where they defeated Druids F.C. 1–0, with James Davies being credited with the goal. Because of a lack of money at the fledgling FAW, Wrexham did not receive their trophy until the next year. For their first decade, Wrexham mostly played friendly matches against both Welsh and English opposition, with the Welsh Cup providing most of their competitive football, Wrexham winning it again in 1883.

1883 also saw Wrexham's first appearance in the FA Cup, when after receiving a bye to the second round of the competition they were defeated 3–4 at home by Oswestry. Crowd trouble at the game led to the club being expelled from the Football Association, leading to the club being reformed in 1884 as Wrexham Olympic. Olympic was dropped from this club's name in 1888.

Thanks to a dispute with their landlords, who had raised the rent of the Racecourse Ground to £10 a year, Wrexham played their home games in the 1881–82 and 1882–83 seasons at Rhosddu Recreation Ground (changing the club's name to Wrexham Athletic for one season), before moving back to the Racecourse Ground for the 1883–84 season, where the club have played their home games ever since.

In 1890 Wrexham joined The Combination league, playing their first game against Gorton Villa on 6 September 1890, with Arthur Lea scoring Wrexham's only goal in a 5–1 defeat. Lea played for the club despite only having one arm as did playing colleague James Roberts. Wrexham finished the season second from bottom in eighth place in the first season.

Wrexham played in the Combination for four years before a rapid increase in costs resulted in the club joining the Welsh League in the 1894–95 season. Wrexham won the Welsh League both years that they were in it, but they then decided to return to the Combination League in 1896, as despite the reduced support they received, the savings made on their travelling expenses outweighed the reduction in gate revenue.

1905–1960
The club remained in the Combination league until 1905, by which time they had managed to win the league four times. After several unsuccessful attempts Wrexham were finally elected to the Birmingham and District League in time for the beginning of the 1905–06 season. Wrexham's first ever match in this league was at home against Kidderminster Harriers at the Racecourse, and two thousand spectators witnessed Wrexham win the match 2–1. Wrexham finished sixth in their first season in this league.

During their time in the Birmingham and District League, Wrexham won the Welsh Cup six times, in 1908–09, 1909–10, 1910–11, 1913–14, 1914–15, and 1920–21. They also reached the First Round proper of the FA Cup for a second time in the 1908–09 season before losing a replay 1–2 to Exeter City after extra time.

In 1921 Wrexham were elected to the newly formed Third Division North of the Football League. Their first League game was against Hartlepools United at the Racecourse in front of 8,000 spectators. Playing in blue shirts, Wrexham were defeated 0–2. The week after this defeat Wrexham travelled north to play Hartlepools and managed to get their revenge by beating them 1–0 in a hard-earned victory.

It was during this particular season that Wrexham achieved many "firsts" in the club's history, such as when Ted Regan scored the club's first ever Football League hat-trick, and also Brian Simpson became the first Wrexham player to be sent off in a Football League game when he was ordered from the field of play against Southport in January 1922. Charlie Hewitt was the club's first ever manager during this period.

In the 1926–27 season the club got past the first round of the FA Cup only to be knocked out by Rhyl. The following season Wrexham fought their way to the fourth round before they lost 0–1 to Birmingham City. A record 32 league goals from Albert Mays helped Wrexham to get to third position in the division in the 1928–29 season. And later in that season Tommy Bamford made his first appearance for the club. He went on to score 201 League and Cup goals for the club during his time at the Racecourse. During the 1929–30 season the club recorded their best ever league win to date when they defeated Rochdale 8–0.

Wrexham enjoyed their best ever Third Division North season in 1932–33, when they finished runners-up to Hull City and won 18 of their 21 home games during the course of the season. This was the first season that the club appeared in their now-familiar red and white strip for the first time for the short-lived 1939–40 season.

During the Second World War years, when long cross-county trips were impossible due to the war, Wrexham played in the Regional League West against local teams from Merseyside and Manchester, amongst others in the north west region. Wrexham's position as a barracks town meant that the team could secure the services of many famous guest players such as Stanley Matthews, Stan Cullis, and others.

In the first post-war season Wrexham equalled their best ever position when they again finished third in the Third Division North. In the summer of 1949 the club made its first ever tour abroad when it played three games against the British army in Germany.

The club reached the fourth round of the FA Cup in 1956–57 where they played Manchester United's Busby Babes in front of a crowd of 34,445 people at the Racecourse, which still remains a club record. The 5–0 defeat did not spoil the occasion for the large home crowd, and later that season Wrexham managed to win the Welsh Cup for the first time in 26 years.

1960–1970
1960 saw the club relegated to a lower tier for the first time in their history, and they dropped into the newly created Fourth Division. But their performances improved following the appointment of Ken Barnes as player-manager. He led Wrexham to promotion to the third division in his first season in charge and oversaw the 10–1 trouncing of Hartlepool United, which is still the club's record league victory. Two years after their promotion, Wrexham were relegated to the Fourth Division again, and in 1966 they finished rock-bottom at 92nd in the Football League after an extremely disappointing season.

1970–1982
With Welsh clubs now able to qualify for the European Cup Winners' Cup by winning the Welsh Cup, Wrexham played their inaugural match in Europe against Swiss side FC Zurich in Switzerland on 13 September 1972, the game finishing 1–1. In the return leg Wrexham won 2–1, advancing to the second round with a 3–2 win on aggregate. The second round drew Wrexham against Yugoslav side Hajduk Split. Over the course of two games the score finished 3–3 on aggregate with Wrexham matching their more illustrious opponents, but they were knocked out of the competition due to the away goals rule.

The 1972–73 season saw the completion of the new Yale stand, with a capacity of up to 5,500. Including the terrace helped to comprise the bottom tier of the stand.

The 1973–74 season saw Wrexham change their badge from the Maelor crest to a brand new badge that had a lot more resemblance to the Welsh roots of the club, with three feathers on the top of the badge and two dragons, one on either side of the badge and facing inwards. This is still the badge for today's team. This season also saw Wrexham reach the quarter-finals of the FA Cup in another cup run. After victories over Shrewsbury Town, Rotherham United, Middlesbrough, Crystal Palace and Southampton, their cup run finally came to an end with a loss to first division side Burnley at Turf Moor, with 15,000 Wrexham fans present to watch the match. Also that season Wrexham just missed out on the promotion spots, finishing in 4th place at the end of the season.

1975–76 saw John Neal's starlets captained by Eddie May, again shocking the football world by reaching the quarter-finals of the European Cup Winners' Cup after another sparkling cup run and defeats of several higher quality opponents. In the first round Wrexham beat Swedish team Djurgårdens IF 3–2 on aggregate. They then managed to knock out Polish side Stal Rzeszow 3–1 on aggregate. Wrexham played Belgian champions Anderlecht in the quarter finals and narrowly lost 2–1 to the eventual winners of the competition.

The 1976–77 season saw Wrexham again beat First Division opposition in both Cup competitions as they went on another cup run, defeating Tottenham Hotspur in the Football League Cup and Sunderland in the FA Cup. However, the league season was a traumatic one as the club, on the verge of promotion to the second division with only four matches left to play, needing just three points to reach their goal, unbelievably missed out after a poor run of form.

Arfon Griffiths took over as player-manager for the 1977–78 season. They reached both the League and FA Cup quarter-finals that season, and Wrexham finally clinched promotion to the second division when they beat Rotherham United 7–1 at a packed Racecourse, and Wrexham went on to win the Third Division Championship that year.

In the 1978–79 season Wrexham made it to the fourth round of the FA Cup, where they narrowly lost to Tottenham Hotspur 3–2 in the replay after the first game finished 3–3. The Spurs team had stars amongst their ranks such as Ossie Ardiles, Ricky Villa, and Glenn Hoddle, and Wrexham were unfortunate to get knocked out.

Following Arfon Griffiths' resignation from the manager's position in 1981, his assistant Mel Sutton was put in charge, with a memorable third round FA Cup win over Brian Clough's Nottingham Forest in another cup run, the highlight of the season.

1982–1992
The summer of 1982 saw Bobby Roberts appointed the club's new manager. Relegation meant the club had dire financial problems, resulting in the sale of many of the club's experienced and talented players. Frank Carrdus, Ian Edwards, Mick Vinter and Wayne Cegieski had already left during the summer, Steve Fox, Joey Jones, Dixie McNeil and Billy Ronson soon followed. Wrexham were again relegated to the Fourth Division after plummeting from apparent mid-table security. The club's slide continued into the following season, and only goal difference prevented Wrexham from being forced to apply for re-election to the League.

The 1984–85 season saw Wrexham take on FC Porto in European competition. Wrexham won the home leg with a 1–0 victory, but in the second leg Porto showed their class and were 3–0 up after 38 minutes. However, Wrexham pulled goals back and the game finished 4–4 with Wrexham advancing on away goals. The second round draw was to pair Wrexham with Italian side AS Roma, managed by Sven-Göran Eriksson. Wrexham lost 3–0 on aggregate over the two legs. Their league performance was even more dire than the previous year, and by the time Bobby Roberts was finally removed from his post, Wrexham were rock-bottom of the entire Football League.

Former Racecourse favourite Dixie McNeil was appointed caretaker manager, and immediately inspired a revival that saw Wrexham win 7 of their last 10 matches and comfortably finish clear of having to apply for re-election, which earned him the job on a permanent basis that summer. His first season in charge saw the team finish mid-table position in an average season, he led the team to a Welsh Cup final win over Kidderminster Harriers. 1986 saw Wrexham make a return to European football with a first round draw against Maltese side FC Zurrieq, whom they beat 7–0 on aggregate to earn a second round tie against Real Zaragoza which they drew 2–2 with on aggregate but they went out on away-goals.

Following the Bradford City stadium fire in May 1985, legislation on ground safety at all football grounds was brought into effect. This eventually led to the closure of the Mold Road stand because it did not reach the necessary safety standards. Led by Dixie McNeil, Wrexham reached the Fourth Division play-offs in 1989, having finished seventh in the league. Wrexham beat Scunthorpe United in the semi-final 5–1 on aggregate, but narrowly lost to Leyton Orient 2–1 in the final. After Wrexham started the next season with just 3 wins from 13 league games, Dixie McNeil resigned before his inevitable sacking.

He was replaced, initially on a temporary basis, by Brian Flynn, but his appointment was made permanent a month later. However the club continued to struggle domestically, and Flynn was forced to make three important signings in Mark Setori, Eddie Youds and Alan Kennedy which saw the team finish in twenty-first place, therefore avoiding relegation.

At the start of the 1990–91 season it was announced there would be no relegation to the Conference Premier as a team had already voluntarily left the league. That season Wrexham were to finish in ninety-second place. Wrexham were knocked-out of the European Cup Winners' Cup in the second round by Manchester United 5–0 on aggregate, who eventually went on to win the trophy.

The 1991–92 season saw Wrexham still in a poor financial state, as they continued to struggle on the field. With the club knocked out of the League Cup and struggling in the league, it was left to the FA Cup to keep the season alive. Having beaten Telford United and Winsford United, they were drawn to play the previous season's First Division champions Arsenal. Wrexham produced one of their most memorable nights to beat the Gunners 2–1 after being behind, with a thunderous Mickey Thomas free kick and a Steve Watkin goal. They lost in the next round to West Ham United 1–0 in a replay after the first game had finished 2–2.

1993–2001
In an attempt to change the fortunes of the club after several seasons in the doldrums at the bottom of the football league pyramid, the 1992–93 season saw Wrexham manager Brian Flynn make a shrewd signing when he enlisted the services of Gary Bennett, who soon settled and helped Wrexham into the promotion race. Wrexham's season came to a head on 27 April 1993 when with two games left they travelled to Northampton Town requiring a win to gain promotion to the next tier of the English football. The game ended with a 2–0 victory to Wrexham and the 5,500 travelling "Reds" supporters there were jubilant when promotion had finally been achieved.

The 1994–95 season would see Wrexham achieve more success in cup competitions, this time going on a run through the FA Cup. Having beaten Stockport County and Rotherham United, they faced Premier League side Ipswich Town at the Racecourse, with Wrexham running out 2–1 winners thanks to goals from Gary Bennett and Kieron Durkan. In the next round, Wrexham were drawn away to Manchester United and despite taking the lead at Old Trafford, United went on to win 5–2.

The 1995–96 season once again saw Wrexham in European action, with their opposition this time coming in the form of Romanian team Petrolul Ploiești; the home leg ended in a 0–0 draw but Wrexham lost 1–0 in the away leg, with the Romanians scoring the only goal of the match, and Wrexham were subsequently knocked out of the tournament.

The 1996–97 season saw Wrexham set off on another amazing run in the FA Cup and beating more top flight opposition. Following wins at Colwyn Bay and Scunthorpe United, they were drawn to play West Ham United at home, the game ending in a 1–1 draw on a snow-covered pitch after a well earned draw. The replay at Upton Park ended in a shock 1–0 win to Wrexham as Kevin Russell scored in the dying minutes to send Wrexham into the fourth round. After also beating Peterborough United and Birmingham City in the following rounds, they played Chesterfield in an all-Division-2 FA Cup quarter final, Wrexham narrowly losing to the Spireites 1–0.

June 1997 was the date for the official opening of Colliers Park, which was Wrexham's new training ground and was situated just outside Gresford on Chester Road. It was built at a cost of £750,000 and is widely regarded to be one of the best training grounds outside of the top flight. It has been used for training by many visiting teams that play at a higher standard over the years.

The 1999–2000 season saw Wrexham again beat a top-flight team in the FA Cup, this time in the shape of Middlesbrough. The final score of the match was 2–1, with the second half goals coming from Robin Gibson and Darren Ferguson after being behind to the Premiership outfit. Wrexham went on to win the FAW Premier Cup in May 2001.

2001–2008: Slide from League One to National League
 
 At the start of the 21st century the club was dogged with many problems off the pitch, including then chairman Alex Hamilton, attempting to get the club evicted from the stadium so that he could use and sell it for his own development purposes – the saga involved the sale of the Racecourse Ground to a separate company owned by Hamilton immediately after he became the club's chairman. In the summer of 2004 Hamilton gave the club a year's notice to quit the ground.

The club's fans developed an affinity with the fans of fellow football league club Brighton & Hove Albion, who themselves had managed to successfully depose their chairman and keep control of their stadium after he had sold the ground for development purposes in almost the same circumstances. On 3 December 2004 the club was placed in financial administration by the High Court in Manchester as the club owed £2,600,000, including £800,000 which was owed to the Inland Revenue in unpaid taxes. Wrexham became the first League club to suffer a ten-point deduction under the new rule for being placed in administration, dropping them from the middle of the League One table to the relegation zone after the point deduction, and subsequently condemned Wrexham to relegation.

Despite their financial troubles, Wrexham went on to win the 2004–05 Football League Trophy by defeating Southend United 2–0 after extra time, in Wrexham's first appearance at the Millennium Stadium in Cardiff. The winning goals were scored by Juan Ugarte and Darren Ferguson as Wrexham ran out winners in front of nearly 20,000 Wrexham fans. Wrexham still retained an outside chance of escaping the drop in the 2004–05 season following an end-of-season winning streak; however, their faint hopes of staying up were ended with a 2–1 home loss to Brentford on 3 May 2005. The 10-point deduction proved decisive in determining Wrexham's fate, as the club finished with 43 points compared to 20th-placed Milton Keynes Dons' 51 – a net points tally of 53 after deduction, which had condemned them to relegation.

In October 2005, Birmingham High Court decided that Alex Hamilton's company CrucialMove had improperly acquired the freehold of the ground and the decision went against him. Hamilton then took this to the Appeal Court in London and it ruled on 14 March 2006 that the stadium must remain in the hands of the club's administrators. On 30 April 2006 the administrators reached an agreement with local car dealer Neville Dickens, subject to agreement by the shareholders and creditors (which was achieved on 30 May), for Dickens to take over control of the club and all its assets. Had the club still been in Administration by 3 June then Wrexham would have automatically been expelled from the League because of their financial situation. Wrexham Football Club (2006) Ltd is the name of the "phoenix" company that took over the assets of the old Wrexham Association Football Club Limited – technically, the club is no longer known as Wrexham Association Football Club due to the takeover of the club by Neville Dickens and Geoff Moss and their associates; this is reflected on new merchandise, although most fans will still refer to it as "Wrexham AFC".

The 2006–07 season started well for Wrexham, as they went 8 games unbeaten. However, the club would then struggle with Denis Smith eventually being sacked in January 2007 with Wrexham in the bottom half of the division and after a poor run of results. He was replaced by coach Brian Carey. Wrexham finished 19th in League Two with 51 points after an impressive late run of form which saw them win 4 out of their last 5 games, which included defeating local rivals Shrewsbury in the last derby match at Gay Meadow. Wrexham's league status was saved on the last day of the season with a vital 3–1 victory on 5 May 2007 over Boston United at home which sent their opponents down to the Conference Premier and ensured that Wrexham would stay in the Football League.

Expectations were high for the 2007–08 season, with fans expecting a promotion push. However, the season started badly with the club in 24th by November 2007. Brian Carey was eventually sacked, and on 15 November 2007, Brian Little was named as Wrexham's new manager and the replacement to Carey, who took the role of assistant manager. After a promising start to his reign, Wrexham experienced a run of seven straight league defeats, prompting the club to bring in eleven new players during the January transfer window. Wrexham went six matches unbeaten before some poor form which saw defeats against some fellow strugglers. Wrexham were finally relegated to non-League following a 2–0 defeat away at Hereford United, ending the club's 87-year stay in the Football League.

2008–2020
The 2008–09 season started well, with a 5–0 home victory against Stevenage Borough. However a run of poor results followed, with Wrexham being left in the mid-table battle, only four points above the relegation zone and only keeping two clean sheets all season. Following a 3–0 home defeat against Rushden and Diamonds, and fans calling for his dismissal, Little left Wrexham by mutual consent. Little was replaced by Dean Saunders. Wrexham's first full season in the Conference Premier ended in a disappointing 10th place. The following year, 2009–10, ended in a similar fashion with Wrexham finishing in 11th position, well off the pace of the promotion battle.

In March 2011 the ownership of the club became subject to two bids: one from Wrexham Supporters' Trust and another from local businesswoman Stephanie Booth. Wrexham's MP and AM indicated that they would prefer Wrexham Supporters' Trust to secure the bid. A third bid later came in, but after WST and Booth came to an agreement, their bid was then re-accepted. In April 2011, the club were served with a winding up order from HMRC, with an unpaid tax bill of just under £200,000. The team finished the 2010–11 season in 4th place, qualifying for a play-off spot, but were beaten 5–1 on aggregate by Luton Town in the semi-final.

During the 2011–12 season, Wrexham were invited back into the Welsh Cup after 16 years, entering at the third round stage. New manager Andy Morrell guided Wrexham to a record tally of 98 points but this was not enough to gain automatic promotion, as they ended the season only 5 points adrift of Fleetwood Town, who gained the only automatic place. Wrexham lost in the play-offs to Luton Town again. Wrexham earned themselves places in both the FA Trophy final and the Conference Premier play-off Final, their first two appearances at Wembley Stadium in the club's 150-year history to date, and within five weeks of one another. In the FA Trophy Final, Wrexham won on penalties after a 1–1 draw with Grimsby Town. A 5–2 aggregate win over Kidderminster Harriers in the two-legged play-off semi-final saw Wrexham through to the Final versus Newport County, the first play-off Final to feature two Welsh teams; Newport defeated Wrexham 2–0.

In February 2014, Andy Morrell stepped down as manager. Billy Barr was appointed as interim manager before being replaced a few weeks later by Kevin Wilkin. Wrexham finished the 2013–14 season in 17th place. In 2018–19, Wrexham finished in 4th place but lost the play-off quarter-final to Eastleigh. In 2019–20, the club finished 19th on points per game after the season was ended early due to the COVID-19 pandemic, the lowest position in the club's 150-year history.

2020–present: New owners

In November 2020, Canadian actor Ryan Reynolds and American actor Rob McElhenney, through the RR McReynolds Company LLC, bought the club. The deal received the backing of 98.6% of the 2,000 members of the Wrexham Supporters Trust that voted and was completed in February 2021. They were included in FIFA 22 as part of the "Rest of World" section, becoming the first non-league team to be featured in the series. In 2021–22, Wrexham finished 2nd before losing the play-off semi-final 5–4 to Grimsby Town after extra time. Wrexham also reached the 2022 FA Trophy Final which they lost 1–0 to Bromley. 
Following the takeover, a docuseries called Welcome to Wrexham was announced to be in production for FX with Boardwalk Pictures. The series debuted on 24 August 2022 on FX and Hulu in the USA, followed by a release on Disney+ in the United Kingdom and Ireland the next day.

The team progressed to the fourth round in the 2022–23 FA Cup, being the only National League team to be able to do so, beating Coventry City in an upset in the third round, and eventually getting knocked out by Sheffield United. The first game against Sheffield United was ESPN's most followed football game across its digital platforms.

Stadium

Since 1864 Wrexham have played their home games at The Racecourse Ground, situated on the Mold Road, which is the main through road heading into Wrexham; it is opposite the residential area of Maesgwyn, situated between Glyndŵr University and Wrexham General railway station. In August 2011 Glyndŵr University purchased the stadium and the club training facilities in Gresford, adding their name to the stadium for it to become The Glyndŵr University Racecourse Stadium. Subsequently, in 2016, Wrexham Supporters Trust secured a 99-year lease on the ground, and the name reverted to the Racecourse Ground. The capacity is 10,500, making it one of the largest stadiums in the National League.

In June 2022, Wrexham AFC purchased the Racecourse Ground freehold from the university and are planning renovations to the stadium.

Training ground
Wrexham's training ground was the purpose-built Colliers Park, in neighbouring Gresford. When the construction had been completed it was officially opened in June 1997, at a building cost of £750,000. It is widely regarded in British football as one of the best training grounds outside of the top flight and one of the best never to have been used by a top-flight team. The England national team, Barcelona, Rangers and the Wales national team have all used it for training purposes. Colliers Park continues to be improved; a running hill, as well as all-weather pitches and a small stand have been constructed since the facilities opened in 1997. Colliers Park is now owned by Glyndwr University as part of their purchase of the Racecourse Ground assets.

For the beginning of the 2016–17 season, Wrexham moved back to their former training ground at Stansty Park. This is also the home of Welsh National League side Lex Glyndwr. Wrexham did however retain the use of Colliers Park for Youth and Reserve fixtures. After one season training at Stansty Park, Wrexham announced they would be moving to a new training ground at Nine Acre for the beginning of the 2017–18 season based near the city centre. Wrexham are currently occasionally training at their former site, Colliers Park.

Honours
Wrexham AFC's honours include:

Domestic

League 

Third Division / Division Two / League One (Tier 3)
Champions (1): 1977–78
Runners-up (1): 1932–33

Fourth Division / Division Three / League Two (Tier 4)
Runners-up (2): 1969–70, 1992–93
Promoted (4): 1961–62, 1969–70, 1992–93, 2002–03

The Combination
Champions (4): 1900–01, 1901–02, 1902–03, 1904–05
Runners-up (1): 1899–1900

Welsh Senior League
Champions (2): 1894–95, 1895–96

Cups

Football League Trophy
Winners (1): 2004–05

FA Trophy
Winners (1): 2012–13
Runners-up (2): 2014–15, 2021–22

Football League Cup (North)
Winners (1): 1943–44

Debenhams Cup
Runners-up (1): 1977–78

Welsh Cup
Winners (23): 1877–78, 1882–83, 1892–93, 1896–97, 1902–03, 1904–05, 1908–09, 1909–10, 1910–11, 1913–14, 1914–15, 1920–21, 1923–24, 1924–25, 1930–31, 1956–57, 1957–58, 1959–60, 1971–72, 1974–75, 1977–78, 1985–86, 1994–95 (Record)
Runners-up (22): 1878–79, 1889–90, 1890–91, 1894–95, 1985–96, 1897–98, 1898–99, 1901–02, 1919–20, 1931–32, 1932–33, 1949–50, 1961–62, 1964–65, 1966–67, 1970–71, 1978–79, 1982–83, 1983–84, 1987–88, 1989–90, 1990–91

FAW Premier Cup
Winners (5): 1997–98, 1999–2000, 2000–01, 2002–03, 2003–04 (Record)
Runners-up (3): 1998–99, 2004–05, 2005–06

Supporters Direct Cup
Winners (1): 2015–16 (Shared)
Runners-up (2): 2011–12, 2014–15

Player records
Most league goals in a season – 44, Tommy Bamford
Most league goals in total – 174, Tommy Bamford
Most hat tricks – 16, Tommy Bamford
Most goals scored in a single game by one player – 7, (Andy Morrell – 16 February 2000)
Most league appearances – 592, Arfon Griffiths (1959–61, 1962–79)
Most capped player – Dennis Lawrence, 89 for Trinidad & Tobago
Most caps while at Wrexham – Dennis Lawrence – 49 for Trinidad & Tobago
Oldest player – Billy Lot Jones – aged 46 v Tranmere Rovers
Youngest player – Ken Roberts – aged 15 years and 158 days v Bradford Park Avenue

Team records
Attendance – 34,445 v Manchester United, FA Cup 4th round, 26 January 1957
League attendance – 29,261 v Chester City, Division Three, 26 December 1936
Average attendance – 11,651, 1977–78
Highest league win – 10–1 v Hartlepools United, 3 March 1962
Worst league defeat – 9–0 v Brentford, Division Three, 15 October 1963
Biggest cup win – 6–0 v Charlton Athletic, FA Cup 3rd round, 5 January 1980
Most games won in a row – 10, 5 April 2003 – 8 May 2003, 2002–03
Longest unbeaten run – 20, 25 January 1902 – 11 November 1902
Most consecutive league clean sheets – 7, 9 October – 26 November, 2011–12
Most clean sheets in a season – 26, 1973–74 and 2018–19
Highest transfer received – £800,000 for Bryan Hughes, Birmingham City, 1997
Highest transfer fee paid – £300,000 for Ollie Palmer, AFC Wimbledon, 2022

Players

Current squad

Out on loan

Notable former players
For all players with a Wikipedia article see Wrexham A.F.C. players

Hall of Fame
The following are members of the Wrexham A.F.C. Hall of Fame. Entry is not restricted to players; anyone who has made a great contribution to the club in any capacity can be considered.

 Billy Ashcroft
 Tommy Bamford
 Tommy Bannan
 Ken Barnes
 Gary Bennett
 Horace Blew
 Brian Carey
 Ron Chaloner
 Carroll Clark
 Karl Connolly
 Dai Davies
 Gareth Davies
 Carlos Edwards
 Johnny Edwards
 Mickey Evans
 Brian Flynn
 Alan Fox
 Bert Goode
 Arfon Griffiths
 Pryce Griffiths
 Phil Hardy
 Ron Hewitt
 Alf Jones
 Joey Jones
 Albert Kinsey
 Dennis Lawrence
 Brian Lloyd
 Cliff Lloyd
 Andy Marriott
 Tommy Matthias
 Eddie May
 Ally McGowan
 Sammy McMillan
 Dixie McNeil
 John Neal
 Gareth Owen
 Ted Robinson
 Kevin Russell
 Bobby Shinton
 George Showell
 Denis Smith
 Ray Smith
 Mel Sutton
 Mickey Thomas
 Billy Tunnicliffe
 Graham Whittle
 Mike Williams
 Andy Morrell
 Mark Carrington
 Wrexham Supporters Trust

Player of the Year
The following players have been named Wrexham A.F.C. Player of the Year.

1975–76  Brian Lloyd
1976–77  Graham Whittle
1977–78  Gareth Davies
1978–79  John Roberts
1979–80  Dixie McNeil
1980–81  Steve Fox
1981–82  Eddie Niedzwiecki
1982–83  Robbie Savage
1983–84  David Gregory
1984–85  Jack Keay
1985–86  Mike Williams
1986–87  Mike Williams
1987–88  Kevin Russell
1988–89  Kevin Russell
1989–90  Nigel Beaumont
1990–91  Mark Morris
1991–92  Andy Thackeray
1992–93  Tony Humes
1993–94  Gary Bennett
1994–95  Gary Bennett
1995–96  Waynne Phillips
1996–97  Andy Marriott
1997–98  Brian Carey
1998–99  Dean Spink
1999–2000  Darren Ferguson
2000–01  Mark McGregor
2001–02  Jim Whitley
2002–03  Andy Morrell
2003–04  Dennis Lawrence
2004–05  Andy Holt
2005–06  Danny Williams
2006–07  Steve Evans
2007–08  Neil Roberts
2008–09  Marc Williams
2009–10  Andy Fleming
2010–11  Jay Harris
2011–12  Neil Ashton
2012–13  Chris Westwood
2013–14  Mark Carrington
2014–15  Manny Smith
2015–16  Connor Jennings
2016–17  Martin Riley
2017–18  Shaun Pearson
2018–19  Rob Lainton
2019–20  Luke Young
2020–21  Luke Young
2021–22  Paul Mullin

Young Player of the Year
The following players have been named Wrexham A.F.C. Young Player of the Year.

1983–84  Shaun Cunnington
1984–85  Andy Edwards
1985–86  Shaun Cunnington
1986–87  Roger Preece
1987–88  Darren Wright
1988–89  Darren Wright
1989–90  Gareth Owen
1990–91  Gareth Owen
1991–92  Phil Hardy
1992–93  Jonathan Cross
1993–94  Dave Brammer
1994–95  Bryan Hughes
1995–96  Mark McGregor
1996–97  Mark McGregor
1997–98  Neil Roberts
1998–99  Robin Gibson
1999–2000  Robin Gibson
2000–01  Lee Roche
2001–02  Shaun Pejic
2002–03  Craig Morgan
2003–04  Craig Morgan
2004–05  Mark Jones
2005–06  Mark Jones
2006–07  Matt Done
2007–08  Neil Taylor
2008–09  Marc Williams
2009–10  Chris Maxwell
2010–11  Chris Maxwell
2011–12  Mathias Pogba
2012–13  Nick Rushton
2013–14  Andy Coughlin
2014–15  Rob Evans
2015–16  Rob Evans
2016–17  Leo Smith
2017–18 N/A
2018–19 N/A
2019–20 N/A
2020–21  Jordan Davies
2021–22  Max Cleworth

Steve Edwards Goal of the Season Award
The following players have won the Steve Edwards Goal of the Season award.

2012–13  Jay Harris v Barrow
2013–14  Andy Morrell v Forest Green Rovers
2014–15  Mark Carrington v Stoke City
2015–16  Dominic Vose v Gateshead
2016–17  Ntumba Massanka v Guiseley
2017–18  Chris Holroyd v Tranmere Rovers
2018–19  Luke Young v Dagenham & Redbridge
2019–20  Luke Young v Bromley
2020–21  Jordan Davies v Halifax Town
2021–22  Paul Mullin v Stockport County

Top scorers
Goal counts are formatted with the league total first, and the total for all competitions in parenthesis.

1975–76  Billy Ashcroft 14 (19)
1976–77  Graham Whittle 28 (35)
1977–78  Dixie McNeil 13 (25)
1978–79  John Lyons 10 (15)
1979–80  Dixie McNeil 14 (21)
1980–81  Dixie McNeil 13 (20)
1981–82  Ian Edwards 11 (15)
1982–83  Steve Buxton &  Robbie Savage 10 (13)
1983–84  David Gregory 19 (24)
1984–85  Jim Steel 14 (15)
1985–86  Steve Charles 21 (24)
1986–87  Jim Steel 17 (22)
1987–88  Kevin Russell 21 (25)
1988–89  Kevin Russell 22 (27)
1989–90  Gary Worthington 12 (16)
1990–91  Chris Armstrong 10 (15)
1991–92  Steve Watkin 13 (19)
1992–93  Gary Bennett 16 (23)
1993–94  Gary Bennett 32 (39)
1994–95  Gary Bennett 29 (47)
1995–96  Karl Connolly 18 (21)
1996–97  Karl Connolly 14 (15)
1997–98  Karl Connolly 7 (14)
1998–99  Karl Connolly 11 (23)
1999–2000  Craig Faulconbridge 9 (11)
2000–01  Darren Ferguson 9 (10)
2001–02  Craig Faulconbridge 13 (14)
2002–03  Andy Morrell 34 (35)
2003–04  Hector Sam 10 (12)
2004–05  Juan Ugarte 17 (23)
2005–06  Mark Jones 13 (15)
2006–07  Chris Llewellyn 9 (11)
2007–08  Michael Proctor 11 (11)
2008–09  Jefferson Louis 15 (15)
2009–10  Gareth Taylor 8 (8)
2010–11  Andy Mangan 15 (15)
2011–12  Jake Speight 21 (21)
2012–13  Danny Wright 15 (18)
2013–14  Johnny Hunt 11 (12)
2014–15  Louis Moult 16 (23)
2015–16  Connor Jennings 14 (14)
2016–17  John Rooney 11 (11)
2017–18  Chris Holroyd 13 (13)
2018–19  Shaun Pearson 6 (6)
2019–20  Bobby Grant 7 (8)
2020–21  Luke Young 12 (12)
2021–22  Paul Mullin 26 (32)

PFA Team of the Year
The following have been included in the PFA Team of the Year, Conference Premier or National League team of the year whilst playing for Wrexham :

Non-playing staff

Board

Managerial history 

 1925–29 Charlie Hewitt
 1929–31 Jack Baynes
 1932–36 Ernest Blackburn
 1937–38 Jimmy Logan
 1938–40 Tom Morgan
 1940–49 Tom Williams
 1949–50 Les McDowall
 1950–54 Peter Jackson
 1954–57 Cliff Lloyd
 1957–59 John Love
 1960–61 Billy Morris
 1961–65 Ken Barnes
 1965–66 Billy Morris
 1966–67 Jack Rowley
 1967–68 Alvan Williams
 1968–77 John Neal
 1977–81 Arfon Griffiths
 1981–82 Mel Sutton
 1982–85 Bobby Roberts
 1985–89 Dixie McNeil
 1989–2001 Brian Flynn
 2001–07 Denis Smith
 2007 Brian Carey
 2007–08 Brian Little
 2008–11 Dean Saunders
 2011–14 Andy Morrell
 2014–15 Kevin Wilkin
 2015–16 Gary Mills
 2016–18 Dean Keates
 2018 Sam Ricketts
 2018–19 Graham Barrow
 2019 Bryan Hughes
 2019–21 Dean Keates
 2021– Phil Parkinson

European record

European Cup Winners' Cup:

Supporters and rivalries

Support
In August 2011, Wrexham were faced with being expelled from the Football Conference, fans rallied and raised £127,000 in one day to help pay a bond, so they could secure football for the forthcoming season. A month later the Wrexham Supporters' Trust (WST) took over day-to-day running of the club. Fan ownership of Wrexham was finally ratified on 12 December 2011. As of May 2015 the WST had 4,129 adult members and joint-owners of the club.

As well as the city of Wrexham, support is drawn from the surrounding towns and villages of the district, such as Gwersyllt and Rhos, the Flintshire towns of Mold, Buckley, Holywell and Deeside. For the 2013 FA Trophy Final coaches of Wrexham fans came from many North Wales towns including; Bala, Bangor, Caernarfon, Colwyn Bay, Denbigh, Flint, Llandudno, Prestatyn, Rhyl and Ruthin. Additionally, many Wrexham fans reside in Shropshire. Exiled supporters clubs can be found in South Wales, Manchester and London. Over the past 15 years, even as a lower-league side, Wrexham have been able to attract gates of 11,000+ for big games at the Racecourse.

Famous Wrexham fans include Canadian astronaut Chris Hadfield, former Royal butler Paul Burrell, actor and television presenter Tim Vincent, actor Llŷr Ifans, actor and Comedian Ted Robbins, Sweet guitarist Andy Scott, Lloyd Roberts of rock band Neck Deep, 2012 Olympian weightlifter Gareth Evans, Sky Sports reporter Bryn Law, Rugby World Cup Referee Nigel Owens and former footballers Neil Roberts, Robbie Savage and Mark Hughes.

Rivalry

Wrexham has a fierce rivalry with Chester, the clubs are just 10 miles apart, but are Welsh and English respectively. The two contest the Cross-Border Derby, the first match was held in 1888 with Wrexham running out 3–2 winners at Faulkner Street, the former home of Chester City, the last derby, to date, was played at the Swansway Chester Stadium where Wrexham won 1–0 on 8 November 2017. Wrexham lead the head-to-head rivalry with 67 wins compared to Chester's 50. Games between the two are classed as "high risk" for potential of disorder and are generally moved to early kick-offs with a large police presence to prevent it, though arrests do still occur for various offences surrounding the fans of both clubs.

Former Chester City player Lee Dixon said of the derby "I'm telling you, Chester versus Wrexham was a real derby! It's difficult to compare if you've not played in each one but there's something special about any derby at any level. I played for Chester v Wrexham and that could get ferocious, It lost nothing in ferocity compared to Arsenal v Spurs". Former Wales and Liverpool striker Ian Rush who played for both clubs, said in 2013 the Cross-border derby between the two clubs is "as intense as they come" and "It is like Wales v England really, it is incredible".

Wrexham also have a fierce rivalries with Shrewsbury Town, Tranmere Rovers, Notts County and Stockport County due to geographical proximity. The games are often moved to early kick-offs, in accordance with police, to minimise the potential of trouble as has happened between clubs previously. In 2003, 32 hooligans were jailed after a Tranmere v Wrexham match at Prenton Park and trouble was again evident when the two clubs met in a 2013 friendly at the Racecourse Ground. Though not as intense as they once were, due to divisional differences, Crewe Alexandra, Cardiff City, Newport County and Swansea City are also classed as rivals. Wrexham have a hooligan gang of supporters that go by the name of "Wrexham Front Line" and have been involved in major disorder around Britain since the early 1980s.

Team mascot

Wrex the Dragon is the official team mascot of Wrexham. The mascot, along with the team nickname "The Dragons", was introduced in 2001–02 by the Commercial manager following a ballot of fans to help increase sponsorship and promote the club's Welsh image whilst also providing a more original nickname as Bristol City, Swindon Town and Cheltenham Town also use the nickname of 'The Robins'.
'Wrex' wears a red face and Wrexham F.C. shirt wearing the number "1864".

Reserves
Between 1988 and 1995 the reserve team of Wrexham played in the Welsh football leagues.

On 2 August 2022, Wrexham announced their participation in the upcoming 2022–23 Central League season.

Literature

Wrexham related books
Wrexham FC 1872–1950 by Peter Jones and Gareth Davies
Wrexham FC 1950–2000 by Peter Jones and Gareth Davies
Wrexham – A Complete Record 1872 – 1992 by Peter Jones
Wrexham; The European era by Peter Jones
Wrexham; Through The Trap Door by Peter Jones
Wrexham FC, An A-Z history by Dean Hayes
The Racecourse Robins from Adams to Youds by Peter Jones and Gareth Davies
The Giant Killers; a Wrexham fan's view by Richard Partington
Wrexham Football Club Pen-Portraits by Don Meredith

The Wrexham football team plays a significant role in the 1994 Peter Davies book Twenty Two Foreigners in Funny Shorts which was written for the World Cup in the US. It also profiles the Robins' ongoing and ultimately successful promotion effort.

Kits

Wrexham's home kit is red shirts, white shorts, and white socks. The club have played in a predominantly red kit with white features since the late 1930s.
The away kit is white shirts, red shorts and red socks.

In 2014–15, to celebrate the club's 150th anniversary, Wrexham wore a red and black hooped Nike home shirt as this was the club's first ever recorded home shirt.

Macron have been the kit supplier of Wrexham AFC since 2016 and helped arrange a pre-season training camp for the first team in pre-season 2017 in Portugal where over 600 supporters travelled over to support the team in a 2–1 win over Louletano. They still visit Portugal each summer.

In April 2011, Wrexham signed a two-year sponsorship deal with Greene King brewery. This was cancelled in September after Glyndŵr University bought the Racecourse, as the university had an exclusive deal with another brewery.

Kit manufacturers and sponsors
Table of kit suppliers and shirt sponsors appear below:

See also
Club of Pioneers
List of Wrexham A.F.C. seasons
Welcome to Wrexham

Notes

References

External links

Wrexham Supporters Trust
RedPassion Fansite and Forum

 
Sport in Wrexham
Former English Football League clubs
National League (English football) clubs
Association football clubs established in 1864
Welsh football clubs in English leagues
EFL Trophy winners
Sport in Wrexham County Borough
1864 establishments in Wales
Football clubs in Wrexham
Companies that have entered administration in the United Kingdom